The following is the discography of the South Korean K-pop girl group miss A, which consists of two studio albums, three extended plays (EPs) and eight singles.

Studio albums

Extended plays

Single albums

Singles

Other charted songs

Music videos

Notes

References

Discography
Discographies of South Korean artists
K-pop music group discographies